Locker Room is a Canadian television series, which aired on PrideVision from 2002 to 2005. A magazine series about LGBT issues and topics in sports, it was billed as the world's first LGBT-themed sports series.

Hosted by Paul DeBoy, the series also featured contributions from Paul Bellini, Nina Arsenault, and Jason Ruta.

References

2002 Canadian television series debuts
2005 Canadian television series endings
2000s Canadian LGBT-related television series
2000s Canadian sports television series
OutTV (Canadian TV channel) original programming
Sexual orientation and sports
2000s Canadian television talk shows